The Thomaston Opera House is a historic performance venue and the town hall of Thomaston, Connecticut.  Located at 153 Main Street, it was built in 1883-85, and is a good local example of Romanesque architecture.  The theater in the building has served as a performance and film venue since its construction.  It was listed on the National Register of Historic Places in 1972.  The opera house's principal tenant is now the Landmark Community Theatre.

Description and history
The Thomaston Opera House is prominently sited in Thomaston's downtown, at the southwest corner of Main and Clay Streets.  It is a large three-story brick building with Romanesque features and a hip roof.  Its dominant feature is a multi-stage square tower, rising through five levels to a clock stage, open belfry with triple-arched openings, and crowning pyramidal roof and weathervane.  The roof cornice is adorned with dentil moulding and modillion blocks.  The third-floor windows are set in round-arch openings with contrasting brick and stone arches.

The building was designed by Robert Hill of Waterbury and built in 1883-85 on land donated by Aaron Thomas, the son of the town's namesake, Seth Thomas.  It was used as a venue for theatrical performances and social events until the 1930s, when it was converted for a time into a movie house.  It was closed down due to safety code violations in the 1960s, and underwent restoration, reopening with town offices on the first floor and the theater continuing on the upper floor.  It is now used for live theatrical productions and other events.

See also
National Register of Historic Places listings in Litchfield County, Connecticut

References

External links
Landmark Community Theatre web site

Music venues completed in 1883
Buildings and structures in Litchfield County, Connecticut
Thomaston, Connecticut
Tourist attractions in Litchfield County, Connecticut
National Register of Historic Places in Litchfield County, Connecticut
Town halls in Connecticut
1883 establishments in Connecticut